Pablo Reinoso may refer to:
 Pablo Reinoso (footballer)
 Pablo Reinoso (designer)